Chrysactinia pinnata, is a Mexican species of flowering plants in the family Asteraceae. It is native to northeastern Mexico, the states of Coahuila, Nuevo León, Querétaro, San Luis Potosí, and Tamaulipas.

Chrysactinia pinnata is a shrub up to 80 cm (32 inches) tall. Leaves are pinnately lobed. Flower heads have yellow ray flowers and yellow-orange disc flowers. Achenes are black. The species grows in forests and chaparral brushlands.

References

External links
Photo of herbarium specimen collected in Nuevo León, isotype of Chrysactinia pinnata

Flora of Northeastern Mexico
Tageteae
Plants described in 1890